Warren MacKenzie (February 16, 1924 – December 31, 2018) was an American craft potter.  He grew up in Wilmette, Illinois the second oldest of five children including his brothers, Fred and Gordon and sisters, Marge (Peppy) and Marilyn.  His high school days were spent at New Trier High School in Winnetka, Illinois.

Biography 

MacKenzie and his first wife, Alix, studied with Bernard Leach from 1949 to 1952.  His simple, wheel-thrown functional pottery is heavily influenced by the aesthetic of Shoji Hamada and Korean ceramics.  He is credited with bringing the Japanese Mingei style of pottery to Minnesota, fondly referred to as the "Mingei-sota style."

MacKenzie described his goal as the making of "everyday" pots.  Accordingly, although his pots are found in major museums and command high prices among collectors, MacKenzie has always kept his prices low and for various time periods did not sign his work (1970s, most of the 2000s) until recently resuming the use of his chop at the end of 2009.  Most of his output was produced in stoneware, although he worked in porcelain at times during his career.

MacKenzie was well known as a teacher.  Since 1953 he had taught at the University of Minnesota, where he was a Regents' professor emeritus.  His students have included Randy Johnston, Dick Cooter, Mike Norman, Jeff Oestreich, Wayne Branum, Mark Pharis, Barbara Diduk, Nancy d'Estang, Paul Dresang, Shirley Johnson, Michael Brady, Sandy Simon, Marlene Jack, and E.A. (Mike) Mikkelsen.

Warren MacKenzie's second wife of 30 years, Nancy MacKenzie, died in October 2014, at the age of 80. Nancy was an accomplished textile artist using found objects from nature and the recycle bin.  Warren continued to live in the home they shared outside Stillwater, Minnesota, where he  maintained his studio until his death on December 31, 2018. Until December 2006, MacKenzie also housed a showroom on his property.  The showroom operated strictly on the "honor system" whereby pots were marked with price stickers and visitors would pay for pots by placing their money in a wicker basket, making change for themselves as appropriate.  Unfortunately, due to theft and customers selling his work for an outrageous profit online, MacKenzie closed his showroom, opting instead to sell his pots through the Northern Clay Center in Minneapolis, Minnesota, Trax Gallery in California, Lacoste Gallery in Massachusetts, and the Schaller Gallery in Michigan, as well as exhibitions around the country.

On December 31, 2018, MacKenzie died aged 94.

References

External links 
November 17, 2014.
 Kerr, Euan, "To Warren Mackenzie, the best pot was one people used", MPR News, Minnesota Public Radio.  May 13, 2019.
 Lewis, Gary, Warren MacKenzie: American Potter.  Unicom 2006.
 Warren MacKenzie Oral History Interview via Smithsonian Institution

1924 births
2018 deaths
American potters
People from Stillwater, Minnesota
University of Minnesota faculty
People from Wilmette, Illinois
Artists from Minnesota
Artists from Illinois
20th-century ceramists
20th-century American artists
21st-century ceramists
21st-century American artists
American male artists
20th-century American male artists